152 Logistic Regiment RLC is a North Irish reserve British Army regiment of The Royal Logistic Corps.

History
The regiment was formed in the Royal Corps of Transport (RCT) in 1967 with two transport squadrons. It was redesignated 152 (Ulster) Ambulance Regiment RCT in the 1980s, and transferred into The Royal Logistic Corps (RLC) in 1993 as 152 (Ulster) Ambulance Regiment RLC. In 1999 it acquired a third squadron from 157 Transport Regiment and was put under the administrative control of the Army Medical Services. In 2006 it re-roled as a transport regiment and was transferred back to control of The Royal Logistic Corps, returning an ambulance squadron to 157 Transport Regiment and acquiring a newly raised third transport squadron.

Under Army 2020 the regiment was paired with 9 Regiment RLC under 102nd Logistic Brigade, while the regiment joins 104th Logistic Support Brigade.  As part of this plan, the regiment became a specialist 'Fuel Support' regiment in 2015, the only unit of its type in the army.  The regiment also works closely with the Royal Engineers' 516 Specialist Team (Bulk Petroleum).

Current structure
Below is the current structure of the regiment:

 Regimental Headquarters, at Palace Barracks, Holywood
 277 (Belfast) Headquarters Squadron, at Palace Barracks, Holywood
 211 (Londonderry) Tanker Squadron, in Derry
 C (Coleraine) Troop, in Coleraine
 220 (Belfast) Tanker Squadron, at Palace Barracks, Holywood
 400 (Belfast) Petroleum Squadron, at Palace Barracks, Holywood

References

External links
 

Regiments of the Royal Logistic Corps
Military units and formations established in 1967
Irish regiments of the British Army
1967 establishments in the United Kingdom